The A131 Autoroute starts at in the outskirts of Le Havre and ends near Bourneville-Sainte-Croix close to exit 26 on the A13.

It is operated by the Société des Autoroutes de Paris Normandie (SAPN). Apart from the Pont de Tancarville where a toll is applicable, the motorway is toll-free. Junctions on the A131 are not numbered. The road section on the Pont de Tancarville is renumbered RN182 to allow non-motorway traffic to cross the Seine.

History
 This autoroute is the result of the merger of the former RN 182, transformed into a motorway between Bourneville-Sainte-Croix and the Pont de Tancarville, and the motorway linking the Pont de Tancarville to Le Havre, originally numbered A15.

List of junctions
{| class="plainrowheaders wikitable"
|-
!scope=col|Department
!scope=col|Location
!scope=col|km
!scope=col|mi
!scope=col|Junction
!scope=col|Destinations
!scope=col|Notes
|-
|rowspan="6"|Seine-Maritime
|rowspan="2"|Gonfreville-l'Orcher
|0.9
|0.6
|
|Le Harve
|Westbound entry only
|-
|1.7
|1.1
| Zone Industrielle de Rogerville-Oudalle
|Le Harve, Gonfreville-l'Orcher, Pont de Tancarville, Rogerville, Oudalle
|Westbound exit to A29 North and A29 South
|-
|rowspan="1"|Rogerville
|3.6
|2.2
|
|Rouen, Amiens, Caen
|
|-
|rowspan="1"|Saint-Vigor-d'Ymonville
|9.8
|6.1
|
|ZI Port 5000-6000
|
|-
|rowspan="2"|Tancarville
|16.9
|10.5
|
|ZI de Port Jerome, Lillebonne
|
|-
|18.2
|11.3
| - Junction 31 Pont de Tarcarville
|Tarcarville
|
|-
|rowspan="3"|Eure
|rowspan="1"|Marais-Vernier
|20.6
|12.8
| - Junction 30
|Beuzeville, Évreux
|
|-
|rowspan="1"|Bourneville
|26.0
|16.1
| - Junction 29
|Alençon
|
|-
|rowspan="1"|Bourneville
|34.2
|21.2
| - Junction 28 Elbeuf
|Bourneville, Elbeuf
|Eastbound exit and westbound entry only
|-

References

External links

A131 autoroute in Saratlas

Autoroutes in France